Rudyard Township is a civil township of Chippewa County in the U.S. state of Michigan. As of the 2010 census, the township population was 1,370. In 2023, Rudyard Township was designated the "Snowy Owl Capital of Michigan".

History 
Rudyard is an unincorporated community within the township located on M-48, near I-75. The community was originally named "Pine River", however, because there was already another town in Michigan with that name, it was changed in 1890 to Rudyard. The name was suggested by Fred Underhill, an executive with the Soo Line Railroad, because of his great admiration for Rudyard Kipling.

Rudyard Kipling wrote back to Mr. Underhill, in reference to the naming of the towns of Rudyard and Kipling, Michigan, with the following written on the back of a photograph: 
 
KIPLING'S MICHIGAN TWINS

"Wise is the child who knows his sire"
The ancient proverb ran
But wiser far the man who knows
How, where and when his offspring grows
For who the mischief would suppose
I've sons in Michigan?

Yet am I saved from midnight ills
That warp the soul of man
They do not make me walk the floor
Nor hammer on the doctor's door
They deal in wheat and iron-ore
My sons in Michigan

Oh! Tourist in the Pullman car
(By Cook's or Raymond's plan)
Forgive a parent's partial view
But may be you have children too
So let me introduce to you
My sons in Michigan

Education
Rudyard Area Schools is a Class D school system, including the areas of nearby Trout Lake, Kincheloe, and some of Dafter.

Their mascot is the bulldog, and their school colors are orange and black. They are currently part of the Straits Area Conference.

Sports achievements
The school's cross country program achieved a great deal of success under former coach Alan Jarvie. The boys' varsity team won the U.P. Division 2 Championship during their 2009 season, and finished runner-up to Stephenson during the 2010 season. The girls' varsity finished runner-up in 2009, and followed with their own U.P. Division 2 Championship in 2010. They also earned a Championship title in 2011, making them the first team in school history to win back-to-back Championships.

In 1982, led by running back Tony Ceccacci, the varsity football team reached the MHSAA finals, losing to Mendon.

In 1997, the varsity boys basketball team finished the season 0-20.

In 2007, the varsity boys baseball team made it to the MHSAA semi-finals, losing 6–3 to Reading High School.

In 2009, the varsity boys basketball team won districts (St. Ignace and Manistique) and regionals (Houghton and Gwinn), but lost in the quarterfinal game to eventual state runner-up Suttons Bay. The game was played at Lake Superior State University.

In 2012, the varsity boys baseball team made it to the MHSAA semi-finals, but lost to Grosse Pointe University Liggett.

In 2015, the varsity boys baseball team once again made it to the state semi-finals, where they lost to Centreville High School.

Geography
Rudyard Township is in south-central Chippewa County on the Upper Peninsula of Michigan. It is bordered to the south by Mackinac County. Interstate 75 crosses the township, with access to Rudyard village from Exit 373. From the exit, I-75 leads north  to Sault Ste. Marie and south  to St. Ignace on the Straits of Mackinac.

Demographics
As of the census of 2000, there were 1,315 people, 491 households, and 370 families residing in the township.  The population density was 14.6 per square mile (5.6/km).  There were 671 housing units at an average density of 7.5 per square mile (2.9/km).  The racial makeup of the township was 88.97% White, 0.30% African American, 5.48% Native American, 0.61% Asian, 0.23% from other races, and 4.41% from two or more races. Hispanic or Latino of any race were 2.13% of the population.

There were 491 households, out of which 39.9% had children under the age of 18 living with them, 60.7% were married couples living together, 8.1% had a female householder with no husband present, and 24.6% were non-families. 22.8% of all households were made up of individuals, and 9.2% had someone living alone who was 65 years of age or older.  The average household size was 2.67 and the average family size was 3.08.

In the township the population was spread out, with 30.7% under the age of 18, 5.2% from 18 to 24, 27.8% from 25 to 44, 24.1% from 45 to 64, and 12.2% who were 65 years of age or older.  The median age was 37 years. For every 100 females, there were 100.5 males.  For every 100 females age 18 and over, there were 92.2 males.

The median income for a household in the township was $37,000, and the median income for a family was $41,875. Males had a median income of $34,375 versus $20,893 for females. The per capita income for the township was $15,941.  About 5.7% of families and 8.0% of the population were below the poverty line, including 8.2% of those under age 18 and 15.2% of those age 65 or over.

Communities

Dryburg was a station on the Minneapolis, St. Paul and Sault Ste. Marie Railroad. It had a post office from 1903 until 1943.

Notable People
Bernice Steadman, American aviator and member of the Mercury 13.
John Petersen, drummer for The Beau Brummels and Harpers Bizarre.
Gary McDowell, Michigan State Representative.

References

External links
Rudyard Township official website
Excerpts from Tales of Rudyard As Told by the Folks, published in 1922 and reprinted by the Rudyard Lion's Club in 1973

Townships in Chippewa County, Michigan
Townships in Michigan